Neville Siebert is a former football (soccer) goalkeeper who represented New Zealand at international level.

Siebert made his full All Whites debut in a 3–5 loss to Australia on 5 November 1967 and ended his international playing career with six A–international caps to his credit, his final cap an appearance in a 1–3 loss to New Caledonia on 8 October 1968.

References 

Year of birth missing (living people)
Living people
New Zealand association footballers
New Zealand international footballers
Association football goalkeepers